Michael Conforti is an American television writer on the soap opera The Young and the Restless. He played Jeremy Rhodes on Edge of Night, and Wally Bacon on Guiding Light. Conforti later became a writer for the soap opera Guiding Light. He became a co-head writer for All My Children and Guiding Light. Conforti is currently a breakdown writer for the television show The Young and the Restless.

Positions held
All My Children (hired by Angela Shapiro)
Co-head writer: May 2001 – June 2001

General Hospital (hired by Megan McTavish)
Breakdown writer (July 2001 – January 3, 2008; March 17, 2008 – October 8, 2008; March 5, 2009 – April 30, 2012)
Script writer (March 24, 2008 – February 26, 2009)
Writer (January 29, 2008 – March 14, 2008)

General Hospital: Night Shift
Script writer: July 12, 2007 – October 4, 2007

Guiding Light
Breakdown writer: 1994 – October 1996, April 1997 – 1998
Co-head writer: October 1996 – April 1997
Script writer: 1990 – 1994
Actor: Wally Bacon

The Young and the Restless (hired by Josh Griffith)
Breakdown Writer: December 13, 2012 – present

Awards and nominations
Daytime Emmy Awards

Wins 
(1993; Best Writing; Guiding Light)
(2003 & 2009; Best Writing; General Hospital)

Nominations 
(1992 & 1999; Best Writing; Guiding Light)
(2004, 2005, 2007, 2008 & 2012; Best Writing; General Hospital)

Writers Guild of America Award

Wins
(1992 season; Guiding Light)

Nominations 
(1995, 1996, 1998 & 1999 seasons; Guiding Light)
(2008 season; General Hospital)

External links

Official ABC-TV: GH
SoapCentral: ABC Daytime appoints second head writer

American soap opera writers
American male soap opera actors
American male screenwriters
Daytime Emmy Award winners
Writers Guild of America Award winners
Living people
American male television writers
1955 births